Procyanidin C1 (PCC1) is a B type proanthocyanidin. It is an epicatechin trimer found in grape (Vitis vinifera), unripe apples, and cinnamon.

Natural occurrence and function 
Procyanidin C1 can be isolated from grape seed extract.

Chemical synthesis 
The stereoselective synthesis of seven benzylated proanthocyanidin trimers (epicatechin-(4β-8)-epicatechin-(4β-8)-epicatechin trimer (procyanidin C1), catechin-(4α-8)-catechin-(4α-8)-catechin trimer (procyanidin C2), epicatechin-(4β-8)-epicatechin-(4β-8)-catechin trimer and epicatechin-(4β-8)-catechin-(4α-8)-epicatechin trimer derivatives) can be achieved with TMSOTf-catalyzed condensation reaction, in excellent yields. The structure of benzylated procyanidin C2 was confirmed by comparing the 1H NMR spectra of protected procyanidin C2 that was synthesized by two different condensation approaches. Finally, deprotection of (+)-catechin and (-)-epicatechin trimers derivatives gives four natural procyanidin trimers in good yields.

Research
Procyanidin C1 has been found to extend life in mice and to make them fitter. It was also found to greatly increase the effectiveness of chemotherapy in mice in which human prostate tumor cells were implanted.

See also 
 Phenolic content in wine

External Links 
 Carissa Wong: Grape seed chemical allows mice to live longer by killing aged cells. NewScientist, 6 December 2021

References 

Procyanidins
Natural phenol trimers